Lainie Frasier (born 1956 or 1957), sometimes credited as Lainie Ferrante, is an American actress, known primarily for voice acting.

Career
Frasier attended the University of Texas, where she received a BFA in theater in 1979. Through college, she did voice-over work, and worked on advertisements and audio production. She started teaching voice acting around 1990, and later started her own teaching business.

Frasier has done a few voices in anime, but is best known for voicing Raindevila in Wedding Peach. She has also made a few appearances in live action film and television productions.

Filmography

Live action
Austin Stories - Mom (ep.11)
Black Vomit - Astrid
Confessions of a Serial Killer - Stranded Motorist
Friday Night Lights - Mrs. Laura Davidson
Rain (2006 film) - Mrs. Whiteny

Anime
Devil Lady - Harpy, Chiyoko's GrandmotherFinal Fantasy: Unlimited - ChocobabaKing of Bandit Jing - Mama StoutLegend of Crystania: The Motion Picture - IrimLegend of Crystania: The Chaos Ring - IrimMAPS (1994 OVA) - MotherMazinkaiser - Baron KaiserNew Fist of the North Star - YuraRurouni Kenshin Trust And Beyond - LandladySonic the Hedgehog: The Movie - Miles "Tails" ProwerWedding Peach - Raindevila Wedding Peach DX - Spider Woman

Video gamesDC Universe Online - Granny GoodnessMetroid Prime 3: Corruption - Aurora Unit 242Pirate101 - Additional VoicesWizard101''

References

External links

Official website

Living people
Actresses from Austin, Texas
American film actresses
American television actresses
American video game actresses
American voice actresses
Place of birth missing (living people)
University of Texas alumni
1950s births
Year of birth missing (living people)
21st-century American women